Convoy SC 67 was the 67th of the numbered series of World War II Slow Convoys of merchant ships from Sydney, Cape Breton Island to Liverpool. The convoy left Halifax on 30 January 1942 and picked up a tran-Atlantic escort in Newfoundland. This marked the start of the allied end-to-end convoy escort system, which remained in effect until the end of the war. Surviving ships reached Liverpool on 15 February.

Ships in the convoy

Merchants

Escorts

References

Bibliography

External links
SC.67 at convoyweb

SC067
Naval battles of World War II involving Canada